North-West Italy is a constituency of the European Parliament in Italy. It consists of the regions of Aosta Valley, Liguria, Lombardy and Piedmont.

As the other Italian constituencies, it has only a procedural goal to choose the elected MEPs inside party lists, the distribution of seats between different parties being calculated at national level (called Collegio Unico Nazionale, National Single Constituency).

Background information

Source: Italian Ministry of the Interior

Seats by party

1979–1994

Since 1994

|- 
! colspan="4" rowspan="1" style="text-align:left;" | Party
! colspan="1" | 1994
! colspan="1" | 1999
! colspan="1" | 2004
! colspan="1" | 2009
! colspan="1" | 2014
! colspan="1" | 2019
|-
| style="background-color:" rowspan="6" |
| style="background-color:" |
| style="text-align:left;" | Forza Italia 
| FI
| 9 || 7 || 5 || || 3 || 2
|-
| style="background-color:" |
| style="text-align:left;" | Lega Nord 
| LN
| 4 || 3 || 3 || 5 || 2 || 9
|-
| style="background-color:" |
| style="text-align:left;" | National Alliance 
| AN
|  2 || 2 || 2 || colspan="3"|
|-
| style="background-color:"|
| style="text-align:left;" | The People of Freedom 
| PdL
| colspan="3"| || 8 || colspan="2"|
|-
| style="background-color:" |
| style="text-align:left;" | Brothers of Italy 
| FdI
| colspan="4"| || 0 || 2
|-
| style="background-color:" |
| style="text-align:left;" | New Centre-Right 
| NCD
| colspan="4"| || 1 || 
|-
| colspan="10" style="background-color:#E9E9E9" | 
|-
| style="background-color:" rowspan="10" |
| style="background-color:" |
| style="text-align:left;" | Democratic Party of the Left 
| PDS
| 3 || colspan="5"|
|-
| style="background-color:" |
| style="text-align:left;" | Italian People's Party 
| PPI
| 2 || 1 || colspan="4"|
|-
| style="background-color:" |
| style="text-align:left;" | Democrats of the Left 
| DS
|  || 3 || colspan="4"|
|-
| style="background-color:" |
| style="text-align:left;" | The Olive Tree 
| 
| colspan="2"| || 6 || colspan="3"|
|-
| style="background-color:" |
| style="text-align:left;" | Democratic Party 
| PD
| colspan="3"| || 5 || 9 || 5
|-
| style="background-color:" |
| style="text-align:left;" | Communist Refoundation Party 
| PRC
| 2 || 1 || 1 || 0 || 0 || 0
|-
| style="background-color:" |
| style="text-align:left;" | Party of Italian Communists 
| PdCI
| || 1 || 1 || colspan="3"| 
|-
| style="background-color:" |
| style="text-align:left;" | The Democrats 
| Dem
| || 2 || colspan="4"| 
|-
| style="background-color:" |
| style="text-align:left;" | Italy of Values 
| IdV
| colspan="2"| || 1 || 2 || 0 || 
|-
| style="background-color:" |
| style="text-align:left;" | Federation of the Greens 
| FdV
| 1 || 1 || 1 ||  || 0 || 0
|-
| colspan="10" style="background-color:#E9E9E9" | 
|-
| style="background-color:" |
| style="text-align:left;" colspan="2" | Italian Radicals
| RI
| 1 || 3 || 1 || 0 || colspan="2"|
|-
| style="background-color:" |
| style="text-align:left;" colspan="2" | Segni Pact 
| PS
| 1 || colspan="5"|
|-
| style="background-color:" |
| style="text-align:left;" colspan="2" | United Christian Democrats 
| CDU
| || 1 || colspan="4"|
|-
| style="background-color:" |
| style="text-align:left;" colspan="2" | Union of the Centre 
| UDC
| colspan="2"| || 1 || 1 || colspan="2"|
|-
| style="background-color:" |
| style="text-align:left;" colspan="2" | Pensioners' Party 
| PP
| || 1 || 1 || colspan="3"|
|-
| style="background-color:" |
| style="text-align:left;" colspan="2" | The Other Europe with Tsipras 
| AET
| colspan="4"| || 1 || 
|-
| style="background-color:" |
| style="text-align:left;" colspan="2" | Five Star Movement 
| M5S
| colspan="4"| || 4 || 2
|-
| colspan="10" style="background-color:#E9E9E9" | 
|-
| style="text-align:left;" colspan="4" | Total
| 25
| 26
| 23
| 21
| 20
| 20
|-
| colspan="10" style="background-color:#E9E9E9" | 
|-
| style="text-align:left;" colspan="10" | Source: Italian Ministry of the Interior
|}

Current MEPs

| style="text-align:left;" colspan="11" | 
|-
! Name 
! Gender
! National party 
! Group 
! Period 
! Preference vote
|-
| style="text-align:left;" | Matteo Salvini
| style="text-align:left;" | Male
| style="text-align:left;" |  League
| style="text-align:left;" |  ID
| style="text-align:left;" | Never sworn in
| style="text-align:left;" | 695,074
|-
| style="text-align:left;" | Giuliano Pisapia
| style="text-align:left;" | Male
| style="text-align:left;" |  Democratic Party
| style="text-align:left;" |  S&D
| style="text-align:left;" | 2 July 2019 – Present
| style="text-align:left;" | 267,871
|-
| style="text-align:left;" | Silvio Berlusconi
| style="text-align:left;" | Male
| style="text-align:left;" |  Forza Italia
| style="text-align:left;" |  EPP
| style="text-align:left;" | 2 July 2019 – Present
| style="text-align:left;" | 187,350
|-
| style="text-align:left;" | Irene Tinagli
| style="text-align:left;" | Female
| style="text-align:left;" |  Democratic Party
| style="text-align:left;" |  S&D
| style="text-align:left;" | 2 July 2019 – Present
| style="text-align:left;" | 106,135
|-
| style="text-align:left;" | Pierfrancesco Majorino
| style="text-align:left;" | Male
| style="text-align:left;" |  Democratic Party
| style="text-align:left;" |  S&D
| style="text-align:left;" | 2 July 2019 – Present
| style="text-align:left;" | 93,175
|-
| style="text-align:left;" | Giorgia Meloni
| style="text-align:left;" | Female
| style="text-align:left;" |  Brothers of Italy
| style="text-align:left;" |  ECR
| style="text-align:left;" | Never sworn in
| style="text-align:left;" | 92,697
|-
| style="text-align:left;" | Angelo Ciocca
| style="text-align:left;" | Male
| style="text-align:left;" |  League
| style="text-align:left;" |  ID
| style="text-align:left;" | 2 July 2019 – Present
| style="text-align:left;" | 89,752
|-
| style="text-align:left;" | Patrizia Toia
| style="text-align:left;" | Female
| style="text-align:left;" |  Democratic Party
| style="text-align:left;" |  S&D
| style="text-align:left;" | 2 July 2019 – Present
| style="text-align:left;" | 79,560
|-
| style="text-align:left;" | Brando Benifei
| style="text-align:left;" | Male
| style="text-align:left;" |  Democratic Party
| style="text-align:left;" |  S&D
| style="text-align:left;" | 2 July 2019 – Present
| style="text-align:left;" | 51,504
|-
| style="text-align:left;" | Silvia Sardone
| style="text-align:left;" | Female
| style="text-align:left;" |  League
| style="text-align:left;" |  ID
| style="text-align:left;" | 2 July 2019 – Present
| style="text-align:left;" | 44,950
|-
| style="text-align:left;" | Massimiliano Salini
| style="text-align:left;" | Male
| style="text-align:left;" |  Forza Italia
| style="text-align:left;" |  EPP
| style="text-align:left;" | 2 July 2019 – Present
| style="text-align:left;" | 37,128
|-
| style="text-align:left;" | Isabella Tovaglieri
| style="text-align:left;" | Female
| style="text-align:left;" |  League
| style="text-align:left;" |  ID
| style="text-align:left;" | 2 July 2019 – Present
| style="text-align:left;" | 32,372
|-
| style="text-align:left;" | Danilo Oscar Lancini
| style="text-align:left;" | Male
| style="text-align:left;" |  League
| style="text-align:left;" |  ID
| style="text-align:left;" | 2 July 2019 – Present
| style="text-align:left;" | 21,952
|-
| style="text-align:left;" | Gianna Gancia
| style="text-align:left;" | Female
| style="text-align:left;" |  League
| style="text-align:left;" |  ID
| style="text-align:left;" | 2 July 2019 – Present
| style="text-align:left;" | 19,183
|-
| style="text-align:left;" | Stefania Zambelli
| style="text-align:left;" | Female
| style="text-align:left;" |  League
| style="text-align:left;" |  ID
| style="text-align:left;" | 2 July 2019 – Present
| style="text-align:left;" | 18,728
|-
| style="text-align:left;" | Alessandro Panza
| style="text-align:left;" | Male
| style="text-align:left;" |  League
| style="text-align:left;" |  ID
| style="text-align:left;" | 2 July 2019 – Present
| style="text-align:left;" | 18,191
|-
| style="text-align:left;" | Marco Zanni
| style="text-align:left;" | Male
| style="text-align:left;" |  League
| style="text-align:left;" |  ID
| style="text-align:left;" | 2 July 2019 – Present
| style="text-align:left;" | 17,959
|-
| style="text-align:left;" | Marco Campomenosi
| style="text-align:left;" | Male
| style="text-align:left;" |  League
| style="text-align:left;" |  ID
| style="text-align:left;" | 2 July 2019 – Present
| style="text-align:left;" | 17,768
|-
| style="text-align:left;" | Eleonora Evi
| style="text-align:left;" | Female
| style="text-align:left;" |  Five Star Movement
| style="text-align:left;" |  NI
| style="text-align:left;" | 2 July 2019 – Present
| style="text-align:left;" | 17,002
|-
| style="text-align:left;" | Tiziana Beghin
| style="text-align:left;" | Female
| style="text-align:left;" |  Five Star Movement
| style="text-align:left;" |  NI
| style="text-align:left;" | 2 July 2019 – Present
| style="text-align:left;" | 14,990
|-
| style="text-align:left;" | Carlo Fidanza
| style="text-align:left;" | Male
| style="text-align:left;" |  Brothers of Italy
| style="text-align:left;" |  ECR
| style="text-align:left;" | 2 July 2019 – Present
| style="text-align:left;" | 10,916
|-
| style="text-align:left;" | Pietro Fiocchi
| style="text-align:left;" | Male
| style="text-align:left;" |  Brothers of Italy
| style="text-align:left;" |  ECR
| style="text-align:left;" | 2 July 2019 – Present
| style="text-align:left;" | 9,335
|-
|-style="background-color:#dcdcdc"
| style="text-align:left;" colspan="6" |
|-
|}<noinclude>

Elections

1979

|- style="text-align:right;"
! style="background-color:#E9E9E9; width:400; text-align:left;" colspan="2" | National party
! style="background-color:#E9E9E9;text-align:left;" | European group
! style="background-color:#E9E9E9;text-align:left;" | Main candidate
! style="background-color:#E9E9E9; width:50;" | Votes
! style="background-color:#E9E9E9; width:50;" | %
! style="background-color:#E9E9E9; width:50;" | Seats
|-
|style="background-color: " width=5px| 
| style="text-align:left;" |Christian Democracy (DC)
| style="text-align:left;" |EPP
| style="text-align:left;" |Benigno Zaccagnini
| 3,426,574
| 34.35
|  
|-
|style="background-color: " width=5px| 
| style="text-align:left;" |Italian Communist Party (PCI)
| style="text-align:left;" |COM
| style="text-align:left;" |Gian Carlo Pajetta
| 2,856,313
| 28.66
| 
|-
|style="background-color: " width=5px| 
| style="text-align:left;" |Italian Socialist Party (PSI)
| style="text-align:left;" |SOC
| style="text-align:left;" |Bettino Craxi
| 1,240,108
| 12.44
| 
|-
|style="background-color: " width=5px| 
| style="text-align:left;" |Italian Liberal Party (PLI)
| style="text-align:left;" |LD
| style="text-align:left;" |Sergio Pininfarina
| 625,173
| 6.27
| 
|- 
|style="background-color: " width=5px| 
| style="text-align:left;" |Italian Democratic Socialist Party (PSDI)
| style="text-align:left;" |SOC
| style="text-align:left;" |Mauro Ferri
| 468,155
| 4.70
| 
|- 
|style="background-color: " width=5px| 
| style="text-align:left;" |Radical Party (PR)
| style="text-align:left;" |TGI
| style="text-align:left;" |Marco Pannella
| 410,716
| 4.12
| 
|- 
|style="background-color: " width=5px| 
| style="text-align:left;" |Italian Social Movement (MSI)
| style="text-align:left;" |NI
| style="text-align:left;" |Giorgio Almirante
| 333,559
| 3.35
| 
|-
|style="background-color: " width=5px| 
| style="text-align:left;" |Italian Republican Party (PRI)
| style="text-align:left;" |LD
| style="text-align:left;" |Susanna Agnelli
| 297,865
| 2.99
| 
|-
|style="background-color: " width=5px| 
| style="text-align:left;" |Proletarian Democracy (DP)
| style="text-align:left;" |TGI
| style="text-align:left;" |Mario Capanna
| 91,576
| 0.92
| 
|- style="border-top:2px solid gray;"
|style="background-color: " width=5px| 
| style="text-align:left;" |Proletarian Unity Party (PdUP)
| style="text-align:left;" |TGI
| style="text-align:left;" |Lucio Magri
| 111,073
| 1.11
| 
|-
|style="background-color: " width=5px| 
| style="text-align:left;" colspan=3 |Others (parties and candidates that won less than 1% of the vote and no seats)
| 109,755
| 1.10
| 
|- style="background-color:#E9E9E9"
| style="text-align:right;" colspan="4" | Valid votes
| 9,967,867
| colspan="2" rowspan="2" | 
|- style="background-color:#E9E9E9"
| style="text-align:right;" colspan="4" | Blank and invalid votes
| 361,261
|- style="background-color:#E9E9E9"
| style="text-align:right;" colspan="4" | Totals
| 10,318,960
| 100.00
| 
|- style="background-color:#E9E9E9"
| colspan="4" | Eligible voters and turnout
| 11,627,452
| 88.75
| colspan="2" | 
|- 
| style="text-align:left;" colspan="9" | Source: Italian Ministry of the Interior
|}

1984

|- style="text-align:right;"
! style="background-color:#E9E9E9; width:400; text-align:left;" colspan="2" | National party
! style="background-color:#E9E9E9;text-align:left;" | European group
! style="background-color:#E9E9E9;text-align:left;" | Main candidate
! style="background-color:#E9E9E9; width:50;" | Votes
! style="background-color:#E9E9E9; width:50;" | %
! +/-
! style="background-color:#E9E9E9; width:50;" | Seats
! +/-
|-
|style="background-color: " width=5px| 
| style="text-align:left;" |Christian Democracy (DC)
| style="text-align:left;" |EPP
| style="text-align:left;" |Roberto Formigoni
| 3,216,336
| 32.47
|  1.88
|  
|  1
|-
|style="background-color: " width=5px| 
| style="text-align:left;" |Italian Communist Party (PCI)
| style="text-align:left;" |COM
| style="text-align:left;" |Gian Carlo Pajetta
| 3,142,339
| 31.73
|  3.07
| 
|  0 
|-
|style="background-color: " width=5px| 
| style="text-align:left;" |Italian Socialist Party (PSI)
| style="text-align:left;" |SOC
| style="text-align:left;" |Carlo Tognoli
| 1,217,774
| 12.44
|  0.15
| 
|  0
|-
|style="background-color: " width=5px| 
| style="text-align:left;" |Liberal Party–Republican Party (PLI–PRI)
| style="text-align:left;" |LD
| style="text-align:left;" |Sergio Pininfarina
| 898,821
| 9.07
|  0.19
| 
|  1
|- 
|style="background-color: " width=5px| 
| style="text-align:left;" |Italian Social Movement (MSI)
| style="text-align:left;" |ER
| style="text-align:left;" |Francesco Petronio
| 451,031
| 4.55
|  1.20
| 
|  0
|-
|style="background-color: " width=5px| 
| style="text-align:left;" |Radical Party (PR)
| style="text-align:left;" |NI
| style="text-align:left;" |Enzo Tortora
| 398,053
| 4.02
|  0.10
| 
|  0
|- 
|style="background-color: " width=5px| 
| style="text-align:left;" |Italian Democratic Socialist Party (PSDI)
| style="text-align:left;" |SOC
| style="text-align:left;" |Pier Luigi Romita
| 324,948
| 3.28
|  1.42
| 
|  0
|- 
|style="background-color: " width=5px| 
| style="text-align:left;" |Proletarian Democracy (DP)
| style="text-align:left;" |RBW
| style="text-align:left;" |Emilio Molinari
| 189,838
| 1.92
|  1.0
| 
|  0
|- style="border-top:2px solid gray;"
|style="background-color: " width=5px| 
| style="text-align:left;" colspan=3 |Others (parties and candidates that won less than 1% of the vote and no seats)
| 65,621
| 0.67
|  0.43
| 
|  0
|- style="background-color:#E9E9E9"
| style="text-align:right;" colspan="4" | Valid votes
| 9,904,761
|
| colspan="3" rowspan="2" | 
|- style="background-color:#E9E9E9"
| style="text-align:right;" colspan="4" | Blank and invalid votes
| 532,579
|
|- style="background-color:#E9E9E9"
| style="text-align:right;" colspan="4" | Totals
| 10,437,340
| 100.00
| —
| 
|  2
|- style="background-color:#E9E9E9"
| colspan="4" | Eligible voters and turnout
| 12,070,999
| 86.47
|  2.28
| colspan="2" | 
|- 
| style="text-align:left;" colspan="9" | Source: Italian Ministry of the Interior
|}

1989

|- style="text-align:right;"
! style="background-color:#E9E9E9; width:400; text-align:left;" colspan="2" | National party
! style="background-color:#E9E9E9;text-align:left;" | European group
! style="background-color:#E9E9E9;text-align:left;" | Main candidate
! style="background-color:#E9E9E9; width:50;" | Votes
! style="background-color:#E9E9E9; width:50;" | %
! +/-
! style="background-color:#E9E9E9; width:50;" | Seats
! +/-
|-
|style="background-color: " width=5px| 
| style="text-align:left;" |Christian Democracy (DC)
| style="text-align:left;" |EPP
| style="text-align:left;" |Giovanni Goria
| 2,907,623
| 30.18
|  2.29
|  
|  0
|-
|style="background-color: " width=5px| 
| style="text-align:left;" |Italian Communist Party (PCI)
| style="text-align:left;" |EUL
| style="text-align:left;" |Achille Occhetto
| 2,423,549
| 25.16
|  6.57
| 
|  2
|-
|style="background-color: " width=5px| 
| style="text-align:left;" |Italian Socialist Party (PSI)
| style="text-align:left;" |SOC
| style="text-align:left;" |Bettino Craxi
| 1,465,601
| 15.21 
|  2.77
| 
|  1
|-
|style="background-color: " width=5px| 
| style="text-align:left;" |Lega Nord–Lega Lombarda (LN–LL)
| style="text-align:left;" |RBW
| style="text-align:left;" |Umberto Bossi
| 542,201
| 5.63
| 
| 
| 
|-
|style="background-color: " width=5px| 
| style="text-align:left;" |Liberal Party–Republican Party (PLI–PRI)
| style="text-align:left;" |LDR
| style="text-align:left;" |Jas Gawronski
| 498,434
| 5.17 
|  3.90
| 
|  1
|-  
|style="background-color: " width=5px| 
| style="text-align:left;" |Italian Social Movement (MSI)
| style="text-align:left;" |NI
| style="text-align:left;" |Gianfranco Fini
| 430,021
| 4.46
|  0.09
| 
|  0
|-
|style="background-color: " width=5px| 
| style="text-align:left;" |Federation of Green Lists (FLV)
| style="text-align:left;" |G
| style="text-align:left;" |Gianfranco Amendola
| 387,387
| 4.02
| 
| 
| 
|- 
|style="background-color: lightgreen" width=5px| 
| style="text-align:left;" |Rainbow Greens (VA)
| style="text-align:left;" |G
| style="text-align:left;" |Edo Ronchi
| 281,428
| 2.92
| 
| 
| 
|- 
|style="background-color: " width=5px| 
| style="text-align:left;" |Italian Democratic Socialist Party (PSDI)
| style="text-align:left;" |SOC
| style="text-align:left;" |Enrico Ferri
| 228,293
| 2.37 
|  0.91
| 
|  0
|- 
|style="background-color: " width=5px| 
| style="text-align:left;" |Proletarian Democracy (DP)
| style="text-align:left;" |G
| style="text-align:left;" |Eugenio Melandri
| 152,116
| 1.58 
|  0.34
| 
|  0
|-
|style="background-color: " width=5px| 
| style="text-align:left;" |Antiprohibitionist List (LA)
| style="text-align:left;" |G
| style="text-align:left;" |Marco Taradash
| 111,285
| 1.16
|
| 
| 
|- style="border-top:2px solid gray;"
|style="background-color: " width=5px| 
| style="text-align:left;" colspan=3 |Others (parties and candidates that won less than 1% of the vote and no seats)
| 205,825
| 2.13 
|  1.46
| 
|  0
|- style="background-color:#E9E9E9"
| style="text-align:right;" colspan="4" | Valid votes
| 9,633,763
|
| colspan="3" rowspan="2" | 
|- style="background-color:#E9E9E9"
| style="text-align:right;" colspan="4" | Blank and invalid votes
| 772,304
|
|- style="background-color:#E9E9E9"
| style="text-align:right;" colspan="4" | Totals
| 10,406,067
| 100.00
| —
| 
|  2
|- style="background-color:#E9E9E9"
| colspan="4" | Eligible voters and turnout
| 12,399,499
| 83.92
|  2.55
| colspan="2" | 
|- 
| style="text-align:left;" colspan="9" | Source: Italian Ministry of the Interior
|}

1994

|- style="text-align:right;"
! style="background-color:#E9E9E9; width:400; text-align:left;" colspan="2" | National party
! style="background-color:#E9E9E9;text-align:left;" | European group
! style="background-color:#E9E9E9;text-align:left;" | Main candidate
! style="background-color:#E9E9E9; width:50;" | Votes
! style="background-color:#E9E9E9; width:50;" | %
! +/-
! style="background-color:#E9E9E9; width:50;" | Seats
! +/-
|-
|style="background-color: " width=5px| 
| style="text-align:left;" |Forza Italia (FI)
| style="text-align:left;" |FE
| style="text-align:left;" |Silvio Berlusconi
| 3,246,029
| 34.55
| 
|  
| 
|-
|style="background-color: " width=5px| 
| style="text-align:left;" |Lega Nord (LN)
| style="text-align:left;" |ELDR
| style="text-align:left;" |Umberto Bossi
| 1,393,415
| 14.83 
|  9.20
| 
|  2
|-
|style="background-color: " width=5px| 
| style="text-align:left;" |Democratic Party of the Left (PDS)
| style="text-align:left;" |PES
| style="text-align:left;" |Achille Occhetto
| 1,364,811
| 14.53
| 
| 
| 
|-
|style="background-color: " width=5px| 
| style="text-align:left;" |Italian People's Party (PPI)
| style="text-align:left;" |EPP
| style="text-align:left;" |Svevo Colombo
| 870,597
| 9.27 
| 
| 
| 
|-
|style="background-color: " width=5px| 
| style="text-align:left;" |National Alliance (AN)
| style="text-align:left;" |NI
| style="text-align:left;" |Gianfranco Fini
| 645,534
| 6.87
| 
| 
| 
|-  
|style="background-color: " width=5px| 
| style="text-align:left;" |Communist Refoundation Party (PRC)
| style="text-align:left;" |EUL
| style="text-align:left;" |Fausto Bertinotti
| 549,234
| 5.85
|
| 
| 
|-
|style="background-color: " width=5px| 
| style="text-align:left;" |Federation of the Greens (FdV)
| style="text-align:left;" |G
| style="text-align:left;" |Carlo Ripa di Meana
| 318,211
| 3.39
| 
| 
| 
|- 
|style="background-color: " width=5px| 
| style="text-align:left;" |Segni Pact (PS)
| style="text-align:left;" |EPP
| style="text-align:left;" |Mariotto Segni
| 275,040
| 2.93
| 
| 
| 
|- 
|style="background-color: " width=5px| 
| style="text-align:left;" |Pannella List (LP)
| style="text-align:left;" |ERA
| style="text-align:left;" |Marco Pannella
| 260,303
| 2.77
| 
| 
| 
|- 
|- style="border-top:2px solid gray;"
|style="background-color: " width=5px| 
| style="text-align:left;" colspan=3 |Others (parties and candidates that won less than 1% of the vote and no seats)
| 430,060
| 5.01 
|  2.88
| 
|  0
|- style="background-color:#E9E9E9"
| style="text-align:right;" colspan="4" | Valid votes
| 9,395,343
|
| colspan="3" rowspan="2" | 
|- style="background-color:#E9E9E9"
| style="text-align:right;" colspan="4" | Blank and invalid votes
| 594,676
|
|- style="background-color:#E9E9E9"
| style="text-align:right;" colspan="4" | Totals
| 9,990,019
| 100.00
| —
| 
|  0
|- style="background-color:#E9E9E9"
| colspan="4" | Eligible voters and turnout
| 12,746,127
| 78.38 
|  5.54
| colspan="2" | 
|- 
| style="text-align:left;" colspan="9" | Source: Italian Ministry of the Interior
|}

1999

|- style="text-align:right;"
! style="background-color:#E9E9E9; width:400; text-align:left;" colspan="2" | National party
! style="background-color:#E9E9E9;text-align:left;" | European group
! style="background-color:#E9E9E9;text-align:left;" | Main candidate
! style="background-color:#E9E9E9; width:50;" | Votes
! style="background-color:#E9E9E9; width:50;" | %
! +/-
! style="background-color:#E9E9E9; width:50;" | Seats
! +/-
|-
|style="background-color: " width=5px| 
| style="text-align:left;" |Forza Italia (FI)
| style="text-align:left;" |EPP
| style="text-align:left;" |Silvio Berlusconi
| 2,574,092
| 29.54 
|  5.01
|  
|  2
|-
|style="background-color: " width=5px| 
| style="text-align:left;" |Democrats of the Left (DS)
| style="text-align:left;" |PES
| style="text-align:left;" |Bruno Trentin
| 1,221,331
| 14.02
|  0.51
| 
|  0
|- 
|style="background-color: " width=5px| 
| style="text-align:left;" |Bonino List (LB)
| style="text-align:left;" |TGI
| style="text-align:left;" |Emma Bonino
| 1,042,515
| 11.97
|  9.20
| 
|  2
|- 
|style="background-color: " width=5px| 
| style="text-align:left;" |Lega Nord (LN)
| style="text-align:left;" |TGI
| style="text-align:left;" |Umberto Bossi
| 916,886
| 10.52  
|  4.31
| 
|  1
|- 
|style="background-color: " width=5px| 
| style="text-align:left;" |The Democrats (Dem)
| style="text-align:left;" |ELDR
| style="text-align:left;" |Antonio Di Pietro
| 632,014
| 7.25  
| 
| 
| 
|-
|style="background-color: " width=5px| 
| style="text-align:left;" |National Alliance (AN)
| style="text-align:left;" |UEN
| style="text-align:left;" |Gianfranco Fini
| 581,532
| 6.67
|  0.20
| 
|  0
|-
|style="background-color: " width=5px| 
| style="text-align:left;" |Communist Refoundation Party (PRC)
| style="text-align:left;" |GUE/NGL
| style="text-align:left;" |Fausto Bertinotti
| 375,881
| 4.31 
|  1.54
| 
|  1
|-
|style="background-color: " width=5px| 
| style="text-align:left;" |Italian People's Party (PPI)
| style="text-align:left;" |EPP
| style="text-align:left;" |Guido Bodrato
| 215,637
| 2.47
|  6.80
| 
|  1
|-  
|style="background-color: " width=5px| 
| style="text-align:left;" |United Christian Democrats (CDU)
| style="text-align:left;" |EPP
| style="text-align:left;" |Rocco Buttiglione
| 192,294
| 2.21 
| 
| 
| 
|-  
|style="background-color: " width=5px| 
| style="text-align:left;" |Party of Italian Communists (PdCI)
| style="text-align:left;" |GUE/NGL
| style="text-align:left;" |Armando Cossutta
| 187,858
| 2.16
| 
| 
| 
|-
|style="background-color: " width=5px| 
| style="text-align:left;" |Federation of the Greens (FdV)
| style="text-align:left;" |Greens/EFA
| style="text-align:left;" |Reinhold Messner
| 159,568
| 1.83 
|  1.56
| 
|  0
|-
|style="background-color: " width=5px| 
| style="text-align:left;" |Pensioners' Party (PP)
| style="text-align:left;" |EPP
| style="text-align:left;" |Carlo Fatuzzo
| 97,073
| 1.11
| 
| 
| 
|-
|- style="border-top:2px solid gray;"
|style="background-color: " width=5px| 
| style="text-align:left;" colspan=3 |Others (parties and candidates that won less than 1% of the vote and no seats)
| 516,355
| 5.92 
|  0.91
| 
|  0
|- style="background-color:#E9E9E9"
| style="text-align:right;" colspan="4" | Valid votes
| 8,712,856
|
| colspan="3" rowspan="2" | 
|- style="background-color:#E9E9E9"
| style="text-align:right;" colspan="4" | Blank and invalid votes
| 761,178
|
|- style="background-color:#E9E9E9"
| style="text-align:right;" colspan="4" | Totals
| 9,474,034
| 100.00
| —
| 
|  1
|- style="background-color:#E9E9E9"
| colspan="4" | Eligible voters and turnout
| 12,796,526
| 74.04 
|  4.34
| colspan="2" | 
|- 
| style="text-align:left;" colspan="9" | Source: Italian Ministry of the Interior
|}

2004

|- style="text-align:right;"
! style="background-color:#E9E9E9; width:400; text-align:left;" colspan="2" | National party
! style="background-color:#E9E9E9;text-align:left;" | European group
! style="background-color:#E9E9E9;text-align:left;" | Main candidate
! style="background-color:#E9E9E9; width:50;" | Votes
! style="background-color:#E9E9E9; width:50;" | %
! +/-
! style="background-color:#E9E9E9; width:50;" | Seats
! +/-
|-
|style="background-color: " width=5px| 
| style="text-align:left;" |The Olive Tree 
| style="text-align:left;" |Several
| style="text-align:left;" |Pier Luigi Bersani
| 2,521,411
| 28.27
|
| 
| 
|-
|style="background-color: " width=5px| 
| style="text-align:left;" |Forza Italia (FI)
| style="text-align:left;" |EPP
| style="text-align:left;" |Silvio Berlusconi
| 2,167,169
| 24.29 
|  5.25
|  
|  2
|- 
|style="background-color: " width=5px| 
| style="text-align:left;" |Lega Nord (LN)
| style="text-align:left;" |NI
| style="text-align:left;" |Umberto Bossi
| 995,057
| 11.15  
|  0.63
| 
|  0
|-
|style="background-color: " width=5px| 
| style="text-align:left;" |National Alliance (AN)
| style="text-align:left;" |AEN
| style="text-align:left;" |Gianfranco Fini
| 697,932
| 7.82 
|  1.15
| 
|  0
|-
|style="background-color: " width=5px| 
| style="text-align:left;" |Communist Refoundation Party (PRC)
| style="text-align:left;" |GUE/NGL
| style="text-align:left;" |Fausto Bertinotti
| 529,564
| 5.94 
|  1.63
| 
|  0
|-
|style="background-color: " width=5px| 
| style="text-align:left;" |Union of the Centre (UDC)
| style="text-align:left;" |EPP
| style="text-align:left;" |Marco Follini
| 358,066
| 4.01
| 
| 
| 
|-  
|style="background-color: " width=5px| 
| style="text-align:left;" |Bonino List (LB)
| style="text-align:left;" |NI
| style="text-align:left;" |Emma Bonino
| 251,650
| 2.82 
|  9.15
| 
|  2
|- 
|style="background-color: " width=5px| 
| style="text-align:left;" |Federation of the Greens (FdV)
| style="text-align:left;" |Greens/EFA
| style="text-align:left;" |Alfonso Pecoraro Scanio
| 202,445
| 2.27 
|  0.44
| 
|  0
|-
|style="background-color: " width=5px| 
| style="text-align:left;" |Party of Italian Communists (PdCI)
| style="text-align:left;" |GUE/NGL
| style="text-align:left;" |Marco Rizzo
| 197,531
| 2.21
|  0.05
| 
|  0
|-
|style="background-color: " width=5px| 
| style="text-align:left;" |Italy of Values (IdV)
| style="text-align:left;" |ALDE
| style="text-align:left;" |Antonio Di Pietro
| 171,239
| 1.92
| 
| 
| 
|-  
|style="background-color: " width=5px| 
| style="text-align:left;" |Pensioners' Party (PP)
| style="text-align:left;" |EPP
| style="text-align:left;" |Carlo Fatuzzo
| 157,376
| 1.76
|  0.65
| 
|  0
|-
|- style="border-top:2px solid gray;"
|style="background-color: " width=5px| 
| style="text-align:left;" colspan=3 |Others (parties and candidates that won less than 1% of the vote and no seats)
| 671,028
| 7.51  
|  1.59
| 
|  0
|- style="background-color:#E9E9E9"
| style="text-align:right;" colspan="4" | Valid votes
| 8,920,558
|
| colspan="3" rowspan="2" | 
|- style="background-color:#E9E9E9"
| style="text-align:right;" colspan="4" | Blank and invalid votes
| 679,533
|
|- style="background-color:#E9E9E9"
| style="text-align:right;" colspan="4" | Totals
| 9,600,091
| 100.00
| —
| 
|  3
|- style="background-color:#E9E9E9"
| colspan="4" | Eligible voters and turnout
| 12,797,155
| 75.02
|  0.98
| colspan="2" | 
|- 
| style="text-align:left;" colspan="9" | Source: Italian Ministry of the Interior
|}
Notes

2009

|- style="text-align:right;"
! style="background-color:#E9E9E9; width:400; text-align:left;" colspan="2" | National party
! style="background-color:#E9E9E9;text-align:left;" | European group
! style="background-color:#E9E9E9;text-align:left;" | Main candidate
! style="background-color:#E9E9E9; width:50;" | Votes
! style="background-color:#E9E9E9; width:50;" | %
! style="background-color:#E9E9E9; width:50;" | +/–
! style="background-color:#E9E9E9; width:50;" | Seats
! style="background-color:#E9E9E9; width:50;" | +/–
|-
|style="background-color: " width=5px| 
| style="text-align:left;" |The People of Freedom (PdL)
| style="text-align:left;" |EPP
| style="text-align:left;" |Silvio Berlusconi
| 2,898,314
| 33.39
|
|  
|
|-
|style="background-color: " width=5px| 
| style="text-align:left;" |Democratic Party (PD)
| style="text-align:left;" |S&D
| style="text-align:left;" |Sergio Cofferati
| 1,999,623
| 23.04
| 
| 
| 
|-
|style="background-color: " width=5px| 
| style="text-align:left;" |Lega Nord (LN)
| style="text-align:left;" |UEN
| style="text-align:left;" |Umberto Bossi
| 1,684,121
| 19.40
|  8.15
| 
|  2
|-
|style="background-color: " width=5px| 
| style="text-align:left;" |Italy of Values (IdV)
| style="text-align:left;" |ALDE
| style="text-align:left;" |Antonio Di Pietro
| 634,573
| 7.31
|  5.39
| 
|  1
|- 
|style="background-color: " width=5px| 
| style="text-align:left;" |Union of the Centre (UDC)
| style="text-align:left;" |EPP
| style="text-align:left;" |Magdi Allam
| 459,998
| 5.30
|  1.29
| 
|  0
|- style="border-top:2px solid gray;"
|style="background-color: " width=5px| 
| style="text-align:left;" |Federation of the Left (FdS)
| style="text-align:left;" |GUE/NGL
| style="text-align:left;" |Margherita Hack
| 260,816
| 3.00
|  2.94
| 
|  1
|-
|style="background-color: " width=5px| 
| style="text-align:left;" |Bonino-Pannella List (LB)
| style="text-align:left;" |NI
| style="text-align:left;" |Emma Bonino
| 250,619
| 2.89
|  0.07
| 
|  1 
|- 
|style="background-color: " width=5px| 
| style="text-align:left;" |Left and Freedom (SL)
| style="text-align:left;" |GUE/NGL
| style="text-align:left;" |Nichi Vendola
| 181,938
| 2.10
| 
| 
| 
|-
|style="background-color: " width=5px| 
| style="text-align:left;" colspan=3 |Others (parties and candidates that won less than 1% of the vote and no seats)
| 309,515
| 3.56
| —
| 
|  0
|- style="background-color:#E9E9E9"
| style="text-align:right;" colspan="4" | Valid votes
| 8,679,517
| 
| colspan="3" rowspan="2" | 
|- style="background-color:#E9E9E9"
| style="text-align:right;" colspan="4" | Blank and invalid votes
| 424,571
| 
|- style="background-color:#E9E9E9"
| style="text-align:right;" colspan="4" | Totals
| 9,104,088
| 100.00
| —
| 
|  2
|- style="background-color:#E9E9E9"
| colspan="4" | Eligible voters and turnout
| 12,697,349
| 71.70
|  3.85
| colspan="2" | 
|- 
| style="text-align:left;" colspan="9" | Source: Italian Ministry of the Interior
|}

2014

|- style="text-align:right;"
! style="background-color:#E9E9E9; width:400; text-align:left;" colspan="2" | National party
! style="background-color:#E9E9E9;text-align:left;" | European group
! style="background-color:#E9E9E9;text-align:left;" | Main candidate
! style="background-color:#E9E9E9; width:50;" | Votes
! style="background-color:#E9E9E9; width:50;" | %
! style="background-color:#E9E9E9; width:50;" | +/–
! style="background-color:#E9E9E9; width:50;" | Seats
! style="background-color:#E9E9E9; width:50;" | +/–
|-
|style="background-color: " width=5px| 
| style="text-align:left;" |Democratic Party (PD)
| style="text-align:left;" |S&D
| style="text-align:left;" |Alessia Mosca
| 3,234,068
| 40.62
|  17.58 
| 
|  4 
|-
|style="background-color: " width=5px| 
| style="text-align:left;" |Five Star Movement (M5S)
| style="text-align:left;" |NI
| style="text-align:left;" |
| 1,467,188
| 18.43
| 
| 
| 
|-
|style="background-color: " width=5px| 
| style="text-align:left;" |Forza Italia (FI)
| style="text-align:left;" |EPP
| style="text-align:left;" |Giovanni Toti
| 1,293,275
| 16.24
| 
| 
| 
|-
|style="background-color: " width=5px| 
| style="text-align:left;" |Lega Nord (LN)
| style="text-align:left;" |EFN
| style="text-align:left;" |Matteo Salvini
| 933,135
| 11.72
|  7.68
| 
|  3
|-
|style="background-color: " width=5px| 
| style="text-align:left;" |The Other Europe with Tsipras (AET)
| style="text-align:left;" |GUE/NGL
| style="text-align:left;" |Moni Ovadia
| 303,805
| 3.82
| 
| 
| 
|- 
|style="background-color: " width=5px| 
| style="text-align:left;" |New Centre-Right (NCD)
| style="text-align:left;" |EPP
| style="text-align:left;" |Maurizio Lupi
| 276,143
| 3.47
| 
| 
|
|- style="border-top:2px solid gray;"
|style="background-color: " width=5px| 
| style="text-align:left;" |Brothers of Italy (FdI)
| style="text-align:left;" |ECR
| style="text-align:left;" |Giorgia Meloni
| 254,453
| 3.20
| 
| 
| 
|-
|style="background-color: " width=5px| 
| style="text-align:left;" |European Greens – Green Italia (EV)
| style="text-align:left;" |Green/EFA
| style="text-align:left;" |Monica Frassoni
| 80,762
| 1.01
|
| 
| 
|- 
|style="background-color: " width=5px| 
| style="text-align:left;" colspan=3 |Others (parties and candidates that won less than 1% of the vote and no seats)
| 119,479
| 1.50
| —
| 
|  0
|- style="background-color:#E9E9E9"
| style="text-align:right;" colspan="4" | Valid votes
| 7,962,308
| 
| colspan="3" rowspan="2" | 
|- style="background-color:#E9E9E9"
| style="text-align:right;" colspan="4" | Blank and invalid votes
| 410,387
| 
|- style="background-color:#E9E9E9"
| style="text-align:right;" colspan="4" | Totals
| 8,372,695
| 100.00
| —
| 
|  1
|- style="background-color:#E9E9E9"
| colspan="4" | Eligible voters and turnout
| 12,689,459
| 65.98
|  5.72
| colspan="2" | 
|- 
| style="text-align:left;" colspan="9" | Source: Italian Ministry of the Interior
|}

2019

|- style="text-align:right;"
! style="background-color:#E9E9E9; width:400; text-align:left;" colspan="2" | National party
! style="background-color:#E9E9E9;text-align:left;" | European group
! style="background-color:#E9E9E9;text-align:left;" | Main candidate
! style="background-color:#E9E9E9; width:50;" | Votes
! style="background-color:#E9E9E9; width:50;" | %
! style="background-color:#E9E9E9; width:50;" | +/–
! style="background-color:#E9E9E9; width:50;" | Seats
! style="background-color:#E9E9E9; width:50;" | +/–
|-
|style="background-color: " width=5px| 
| style="text-align:left;" |League 
| style="text-align:left;" |ID
| style="text-align:left;" |Matteo Salvini
| 3,190,306
| 40.70
|  28.28 
| 
|  7
|-
|style="background-color: " width=5px| 
| style="text-align:left;" |Democratic Party (PD)
| style="text-align:left;" |S&D
| style="text-align:left;" |Giuliano Pisapia
| 1,838,355
| 23.45
|  17.17 
| 
|  4 
|-
|style="background-color: " width=5px| 
| style="text-align:left;" |Five Star Movement (M5S)
| style="text-align:left;" |NI
| style="text-align:left;" |
| 871,370
| 11.12
|  7.31
| 
|  2
|-
|style="background-color: " width=5px| 
| style="text-align:left;" |Forza Italia (FI)
| style="text-align:left;" |EPP
| style="text-align:left;" |Silvio Berlusconi
| 689,433
| 8.80
|  7.44
| 
|  1
|-
|style="background-color: " width=5px| 
| style="text-align:left;" |Brothers of Italy (FdI)
| style="text-align:left;" |ECR
| style="text-align:left;" |Giorgia Meloni
| 443,136
| 5.65
|  2.45
| 
|  2
|- style="border-top:2px solid gray;"
|style="background-color: " width=5px| 
| style="text-align:left;" |More Europe (+E)
| style="text-align:left;" |RE
| style="text-align:left;" |Benedetto Della Vedova
| 246,824
| 3.15
| 
| 
| 
|- 
|style="background-color: " width=5px| 
| style="text-align:left;" |Green Europe (EV)
| style="text-align:left;" |Green/EFA
| style="text-align:left;" |Pippo Civati
| 190,778
| 2.43
| 
| 
| 
|- 
|style="background-color: " width=5px| 
| style="text-align:left;" |The Left (LS)
| style="text-align:left;" |GUE/NGL
| style="text-align:left;" |
| 115,445
| 1.47
|  2.35
| 
|  1
|- 
|style="background-color: " width=5px| 
| style="text-align:left;" colspan=3 |Others (parties and candidates that won less than 1% of the vote and no seats)
| 253,090
| 3.22
| —
| 
|  0
|- style="background-color:#E9E9E9"
| style="text-align:right;" colspan="4" | Valid votes
| 7,838,737
| 
| colspan="3" rowspan="2" | 
|- style="background-color:#E9E9E9"
| style="text-align:right;" colspan="4" | Blank and invalid votes
| 274,949
| 
|- style="background-color:#E9E9E9"
| style="text-align:right;" colspan="4" | Totals
| 8,113,686
| 100.00
| —
| 
| 
|- style="background-color:#E9E9E9"
| colspan="4" | Eligible voters and turnout
| 12,760,430
| 63.58
|  2.40
| colspan="2" | 
|- 
| style="text-align:left;" colspan="9" | Source: Italian Ministry of the Interior
|}

External links
 European Election News by European Election Law Association (Eurela)

References

European Parliament constituencies in Italy
1979 establishments in Italy
Constituencies established in 1979